The Kekek River is a tributary of the Mégiscane River, flowing into the Senneterre area of La Vallée-de-l'Or Regional County Municipality, in the administrative region of Abitibi-Témiscamingue, in Quebec, Canada.

The Kekek River is located north of zec Festubert and south-west of Gouin Reservoir.

The Kekek River flows entirely into forest land. Forestry is the main economic activity of this hydrographic slope; recreational tourism activities, second. The surface of the river is usually frozen from mid-December to mid-April.

Geography

Toponymy 
The term "Kekek" is of Algonquin origin. His three k letter, forming a palindrome, is similar in pronunciation to the province of Quebec. This designation was indicated in its geographical exploration of 1906 by Eugène Rouillard in the form Kekeksipi, Kekek, Sparrowhawk and sipi, river.

The toponym "Kekek River" was formalized on December 5, 1968, at the Commission de toponymie du Québec.

See also

References

External links 

La Vallée-de-l’Or
Rivers of Abitibi-Témiscamingue
Nottaway River drainage basin
Jamésie